The 1999 Finnish Figure Skating Championships took place between December 11 and 13, 1998 in Joensuu. Skaters competed in the disciplines of men's singles, women's singles, and ice dancing on the senior and junior levels. The event was used to help determine the Finnish team to the 1999 European Championships.

Senior results

Men

Ladies

Ice dancing

External links
 results

1998 in figure skating
1999 in figure skating
Finnish Figure Skating Championships
1998 in Finnish sport
1999 in Finnish sport